Bojan Lazić (Serbian Cyrillic: Бојан Лaзић; born 13 May 1974 in Kruševac) is a professional Serbian football player who plays for Soproni VSE in the Hungarian 2nd division.

External sources
 Photo and profile at Ferencvaros official website.

1974 births
Living people
Serbian footballers
Serbian expatriate footballers
MTK Budapest FC players
FC Sopron players
Ferencvárosi TC footballers
Expatriate footballers in Hungary
Association football midfielders
Serbian expatriate sportspeople in Hungary